The Vulture Wally (German: Die Geierwally) is a 1921 German silent drama film directed by Ewald André Dupont and starring Albert Steinrück, Henny Porten and William Dieterle. The film is a bergfilm based on a novel by Wilhelmine von Hillern. It is a melodrama set in the Alps, and was one of Dupont's most successful films of the early 1920s.

Cast
Albert Steinrück as Stromminger
Henny Porten as Wally
William Dieterle as Der Bären-Joseph 
Eugen Klöpfer as Der Gellner-Vincenz 
Elise Zachow-Vallentin as Luckard 
Marie Grimm-Einödshofer as Die Obermagd 
Julius Brandt as Klettenmeyer 
Wilhelm Diegelmann as Roferbauer sen. 
Gerd Fricke as Roferbauer jun. 
Grete Diercks as Afra

See also
La Leggenda di Wally (1930)
La Wally (1932, based on the opera)
The Vulture Wally (1940)
The Vulture Wally (1956)

References

External links

1921 drama films
German drama films
Films of the Weimar Republic
German silent feature films
Films directed by E. A. Dupont
Films set in Bavaria
Films set in the Alps
Films based on German novels
Mountaineering films
German black-and-white films
UFA GmbH films
Silent drama films
Silent adventure films
1920s German films